The 2020–21 Duke Blue Devils women's basketball team represented Duke University during the 2020–21 NCAA Division I women's basketball season.  The Blue Devils were led by first year head coach Kara Lawson and played their home games at Cameron Indoor Stadium in Durham, North Carolina as members of the Atlantic Coast Conference.

During the off-season, Duke announced that head coach Joanne McCallie had retired after thirteen years as head coach.  On July 11, 2020, Kara Lawson was announced as the new head coach.

On December 25, 2020, it was announced that the team would end their season due to COVID-19 concerns.

The Blue Devils finished the season 3–1, and 0–1 in ACC play.  Due to their season cancellation they did not participate in the ACC tournament, NCAA tournament or WNIT.

Previous season
The 2019-20 Blue Devils finished the season 18–12, 12–6 in ACC play to finish in third place for the regular season. As the third seed in the ACC tournament, they lost to Boston College in the Quarterfinals.  The NCAA tournament and WNIT were cancelled due to the COVID-19 outbreak.

Off-season

Departures

Incoming transfers

Recruiting Class

Source:

Roster

Schedule

Source

|-
!colspan=12 style="background:#001A57; color:#FFFFFF;"| Regular season

Rankings
2020–21 NCAA Division I women's basketball rankings

Coaches did not release a Week 2 poll and AP does not release a final poll.

See also
 2020–21 Duke Blue Devils men's basketball team

References

Duke Blue Devils women's basketball seasons
Duke
Duke